Abdou Njie (born 26 September 1992) is a Gambian retired footballer who played as a defender for Gambia Ports Authority FC.

References

1992 births
Living people
Sportspeople from Banjul
Gambian footballers
The Gambia international footballers
The Gambia under-20 international footballers
The Gambia youth international footballers
Association football defenders
Gambia Ports Authority FC players